The Marlborough Downs Challenge is an ultramarathon across the Marlborough Downs. The race is nearly all on footpaths. It starts and finishes in Marlborough and the course goes as far as Devizes. The race is organised by Marlborough Running Club. A  event is organised on the same day. A number of walkers participate in the events.

The 2019 event took place on 11 May and was the 17th running of the event.

Past Results 

The winners of the recent races are given below.

References

External links
Web site with entry form

Ultramarathons in the United Kingdom
Sport in Wiltshire
Marlborough, Wiltshire